Native Dancer an album by Wayne Shorter and Milton Nascimento, and features some of his most acclaimed compositions. It is notable for blending jazz, rock and funk elements with Brazilian rhythms in an attempt to create "world" music broadly accessible to people from many different cultures. Many American musicians have mentioned being influenced by the album, including bassist Esperanza Spalding, drummer Chester Thompson and vocalist Maurice White of Earth, Wind, and Fire.

Track listing 
 "Ponta de Areia" (Milton Nascimento) – 5:18
 "Beauty and the Beast" (Wayne Shorter) – 5:04
 "Tarde" (Fernando Brant, Nascimento) – 5:49
 "Miracle of the Fishes" (Brant, Nascimento) – 4:48
 "Diana" (Wayne Shorter) – 3:04   
 "From the Lonely Afternoons" (Brant, Nascimento) – 3:15
 "Ana Maria" (Shorter) – 5:10
 "Lilia" (Nascimento) – 7:03
 "Joanna's Theme" (Herbie Hancock) – 4:17

Personnel 
Musicians
 Wayne Shorter – soprano saxophone (tracks 1, 2, 4, 8, 9), tenor saxophone (tracks 4-6), piano (tracks 5-7), electric piano (track 8)
 Milton Nascimento – vocals (tracks 1, 3, 4, 6, 8), acoustic guitar (tracks 3, 4, 6, 8)
 David Amaro – acoustic guitar (tracks 4, 6, 7, 9)
 Jay Graydon – electric guitar (track 1), bass (track 2)
 Herbie Hancock – piano (tracks 1, 2, 7, 9), electric piano (track 3)
 Wagner Tiso – organ (tracks 1, 3, 4, 7), electric piano (tracks 1, 2, 4, 6, 9), bass (track 8)
 Dave McDaniel – bass (tracks 1, 3-7, 9)
 Robertinho Silva – drums (tracks 1-4, 6-8), percussion (tracks 5, 9)
 Airto Moreira – percussion (tracks 2, 4, 5, 7, 8)

Production
 Jim Price – producer
 Wly – engineer (lacquer cutting)
 Wally Traugott – engineer (mastering)
 Robert Fraboni – engineer
 Joe Tuzen – assistant engineer
 Nancy Donald – artwork
 Kenneth McGowan – photography

References 

1975 albums
Columbia Records albums
Wayne Shorter albums
Milton Nascimento albums
albums produced by Rob Fraboni